Faed Mustafa (sometimes Fayed Mustafa; born July 23, 1965) is a Palestinian diplomat and current Ambassador of Palestine to Turkey, presenting his credentials to Turkish President Recep Tayyip Erdoğan on 17 June 2015.

He was formerly  Ambassador of Palestine to Russia, presenting his credentials to Russian President Dmitry Medvedev on 16 December 2009, and departing Russia on 28 May 2015. Prior to his appointment as Ambassador, he had served for 11 years in the Moscow embassy in various positions.

Mustafa has called on the reestablishment of the 1967 borders with Israel and the Palestinian territories if the current talks fail.

References

1965 births
Living people
Ambassadors of the State of Palestine to Russia
Ambassadors of the State of Palestine to Turkey
Peoples' Friendship University of Russia alumni
People from Deir Ballut
Yarmouk University alumni
Palestinian expatriates in Jordan